In software development (and, by extension, in content-editing environments, especially wikis, that make use of the software development process of revision control), reversion or reverting is the abandonment of one or more recent changes in favor of a return to a previous version of the material at hand (typically software source code in the context of application development; HTML, CSS or script code in the context of web development; or content and formatting thereof in the context of wikis).

A revert may be done for a wide variety of reasons, including: fixing errors introduced by previous edits; restoring the material to a state that was not contentious until new disputes can be resolved; undoing scope creep; regression testing; and even petty malice, vandalistic intent, or personal unhappiness with the author of a previous change.

See also
 Revision control
 Sandbox (computer security)

Software development process